The 2011–12 season of Bayern Munich began on 27 June with their first training session. In the yearly Forbes' list of the most valuable football clubs, Bayern Munich were ranked the fifth-most valuable team in the world.

Review and events
Nils Petersen of Energie Cottbus became the first official signing of Bayern's 2011–12 season. The next two signings were Schalke 04 goalkeeper Manuel Neuer followed shortly thereafter by former Schalke right-back Rafinha (after having spent one season at Genoa). On 27 June 2011, it was announced that Gamba Osaka's Japanese teenage prodigy Takashi Usami would be joining Bayern on a one-season loan (with an option to make the switch permanent). Usami became the first Japanese player ever to play for Bayern. On 14 July, Bayern confirmed the signing of the defender Jérôme Boateng from Manchester City, following drawn-out negotiations.

In light of the signing of Neuer, goalkeeper Thomas Kraft departed for newly promoted Hertha BSC. Andreas Ottl also joined Hertha. Hamit Altıntop joined Real Madrid, while Miroslav Klose opted to join Lazio after negotiations with Bayern over a new contract failed. All these players left on free transfers. Mehmet Ekici joined Werder Bremen for €5 million.

On 1 August, Bayern played their first competitive match of the season against Eintracht Braunschweig. The match was the competitive debut for Manuel Neuer, Jérôme Boateng and Rafinha. The match saw the beginning of Jupp Heynckes' third stint in charge of the club. Bayern won the match with goals from Mario Gómez, Bastian Schweinsteiger and Thomas Müller.

Friendlies

Pre-season

LIGA total! Cup 2011
Bayern played in the 2011 LIGA total! Cup. The tournament was held in the Coface Arena and organized by Bayern's prime sponsor Deutsche Telekom. In this tournament matches consisted of two 30 minutes halves each. The Reds faced Hamburger SV in the first game and Mainz 05 in the second game. Borussia Dortmund was the winner of the tournament.

Audi Cup 2011
Bayern played the 2011 Audi Cup at home in the Allianz Arena, with Milan, Barcelona and Internacional from Brazil in a four-team, knockout tournament.

Other friendlies
Bayern travelled to Trentino, Italy, in early July to play a Trentino regional XI and the Qatar national team in friendlies. After that, Bayern played Carl Zeiss Jena in a benefit match. Between the LIGA total! Cup and the Audi Cup, Bayern played the annual Dream Game against two official fan clubs in Passau. The season officially started on 1 August with the Round 1 of the DFB-Pokal against Eintracht Braunschweig. The first Bundesliga match was against Borussia Mönchengladbach on 7 August 2011. After the Bundesliga started, Bayern played a benefit match against the club from Thomas Müller's home town.

Mid-season
Bayern's winter training camp took place in Doha, Qatar, from 2 January until 9 January 2012. There, Bayern played against Al-Sailiya S.C., the "African Club of the Century" Al-Ahly S.C. from Cairo and a local U-19. After that, they played the Audi Football Summit in India against the India National Team and Rot-Weiß Erfurt in a benefit match.

Post-season
Bayern played against the Netherlands national team in a compensation match for Arjen Robben's injury during the 2010 FIFA World Cup.

Competitions

Bundesliga
The 2011–12 Bundesliga campaign began on 7 August when Bayern played in the opening game of the season against Borussia Mönchengladbach.

League table

DFB-Pokal
Bayern kicked off the 2011–12 DFB-Pokal against Eintracht Braunschweig in Braunschweig, where they advanced to the second round with a 3–0 victory.

UEFA Champions League

Bayern Munich qualified for the play-off round of the 2011–12 UEFA Champions League by finishing third in the Bundesliga in 2010–11.

Play-off round

Group stage

Knockout phase

Round of 16

Quarter-finals

Semi-finals

Final

Overall record

Squad information

Goal scorers

All competitions

Bundesliga

UEFA Champions League

DFB-Pokal

|-
|()* = Goals in Play-off
|- align=left style="background:#DCDCDC"
| colspan="12"|Last updated: 20 May 2012
|-

Penalties

All competitions

Bundesliga

UEFA Champions League

DFB-Pokal

|-
|()* = Penalties saved
|- align=left style="background:#DCDCDC"
| colspan="12"|Last updated: 20 May 2012
|-

Bookings

All competitions

Bundesliga

UEFA Champions League

DFB-Pokal

|-
|Y = Yellow Cards, YY = Sending Offs after Second Yellow Card, R = Sending Offs after Red Card
|- align=left style="background:#DCDCDC"
| colspan="12"|Last updated: 19 May 2012
|-

Minutes played

Bundesliga

|- align=left style="background:#DCDCDC"
| colspan="12"|Last updated: 5 May 2012
|-

Transfers and loans

Transfers in

Total spending:  €43.8 million

Transfers out

Total income:  €5 million

Players

Management and coaching staff

|-
|}

References

FC Bayern Munich seasons
Bayern Munich season 2011-12
Bayern Munich